Siminicea is a commune located in Suceava County, Western Moldavia, northeastern Romania. It is composed of two villages, more specifically Grigorești and Siminicea.

Politics and local administration

Communal council 

The commune's current local council has the following political composition, according to the results of the 2020 Romanian local elections:

Demographics

Natives 

 Viorel Hrebenciuc, politician
 Leonard Mociulschi, Romanian general

References 

Communes in Suceava County
Localities in Western Moldavia